Allie Ray Hull (June 24, 1915 – December 11, 2006) was an American Republican politician. After many years on the Augusta County Board of Supervisors, he was elected to the Virginia House of Delegates in 1981.

References

External links
 
 

1915 births
2006 deaths
Republican Party members of the Virginia House of Delegates
20th-century American politicians
United States Army Air Forces personnel of World War II
United States Army Air Forces non-commissioned officers